Jonquière (2021 population: 60,250) is a borough (arrondissement) of the city of Saguenay in the Saguenay–Lac-Saint-Jean region of Quebec, Canada. It is located on the Saguenay River, near the borough of Chicoutimi.

History

Jonquière was founded in 1847 by Marguerite Belley, who came from La Malbaie to settle on the Rivière aux Sables. It was named after Jacques-Pierre de Taffanel de la Jonquière, Marquis de la Jonquière, governor of New France from 1749 to 1752.

Growth came from the construction of pulp and paper mills at the beginning of the 20th century. Between 1925 and 1928, the world's largest aluminum plant was built along with the city Arvida (then a separate town). In 1942, to supply power to the plant, Alcan built a hydroelectric station at Shipshaw that was the largest in the world at that time. Jonquière, Arvida, and Kénogami were amalgamated into a single city, Jonquière, in 1975. Jonquière was the host city for the Quebec Games in the winter of 1976, and for the Canoe/Kayak World Championships in slalom and whitewater racing, in 1979.

Much of Jonquière's development owed its strength to the Price family, who ran a pulp and paper factory in Kénogami. Today that factory is owned by Resolute Forest Products. Arvida is the home of an aluminium plant owned by Rio Tinto Alcan.

When the city of Saguenay was constituted on February 18, 2002 by municipal amalgamation, the borough of Jonquière was created from the former city of Jonquière, the former municipality of Shipshaw, and the former municipality of Lac-Kénogami. The former city of Jonquière had a population of 54,842 in the Canada 2001 Census, the last census in which Jonquière was counted as a separate city.

The heavy metal band Voivod formed in Jonquière.

The Rivière aux Sables runs through the centre of Jonquière. Significant damage to the city's buildings was caused by the 1996 Saguenay Flood.

Transportation

Rail
Jonquière is the northern terminus of the Montreal–Jonquière passenger train operated by Via Rail. Three round-trip trains per week run between Jonquière station and Montreal Central Station, scheduled to take about nine hours each way. This route is shared by the Montreal–Senneterre train as far as Hervey station. From Montreal, passengers can connect to trains serving major destinations such as Quebec City, Ottawa, Toronto, Halifax, and New York City.

Notable people
Christiane Chabot, artist
Bernard Jean, oboist, conductor, and music educator
Pierre Pilote, NHL hall of famer
Rafaël Harvey-Pinard, NHL player
Annie Villeneuve, singer-songwriter
Voivod, heavy metal band
 Guillaume Morissette, novelist

Mayors
Jean Allard ( – January 20, 1868), (1872–1876) and (February 5, 1894 – August 26, 1895 Death)
Jules Gauthier Me Jules Gauthier (1942 - bef 1949)
Camille Gagné
Francis Dufour (1975–1985) (Arvida 1967 – 1975)
Gilles Marceau
Marcel Martel ( – November 7, 1999)
Daniel Giguère (November 7, 1999 – February 18, 2002)

References

External links

 Borough Council of Jonquière
 Municipality of Jonquiere (Archive)
  Municipality of Jonquiere (Archive)
 "Giant of the North" Popular Mechanics, December 1943, article on the crash program to create the Shipshaw hydroelectric project

Populated places established in 1847
Populated places disestablished in 2002
Boroughs of Saguenay, Quebec
Former municipalities in Quebec
Former cities in Quebec
1847 establishments in Canada
2002 disestablishments in Quebec